Southern Gothic may refer to:

Southern Gothic literature
Southern Gothic (album), a 2010 album by The Constellations
Southern Gothic (2007 film)
Southern Gothic Productions, the production company of Hilarie Burton
The Southern Gothic, an American country and rock music group
Southern French Gothic, sometimes simply referred to as Southern Gothic, is a style of architecture particular to the south of France